
Gmina Przysucha is an urban-rural gmina (administrative district) in Przysucha County, Masovian Voivodeship, in east-central Poland.

Villages
Apart from the town of Przysucha, Gmina Przysucha contains the villages and settlements of Beźnik, Dębiny, Długa Brzezina, Gaj, Głęboka Droga, Gliniec, Hucisko, Jakubów, Janików, Janów, Kolonia Szczerbacka, Kozłowiec, Krajów, Kuźnica, Lipno, Mariówka, Pomyków, Ruski Bród, Skrzyńsko, Smogorzów, Wistka, Wola Więcierzowa, Zawada and Zbożenna.

Neighbouring gminas
Gmina Przysucha is bordered by the gminas of Borkowice, Chlewiska, Gielniów, Gowarczów, Końskie, Potworów, Przytyk, Rusinów, Stąporków and Wieniawa.

References
Polish official population figures 2006

Przysucha
Przysucha County